Hroniss Grasu (born August 12, 1991) is an American football center for the Las Vegas Raiders of the National Football League (NFL). He played college football for the University of Oregon, and was drafted by the Chicago Bears in the third round of the 2015 NFL Draft.

Early years
A native of Los Angeles, California, Grasu attended Crespi Carmelite High School, where he was an All-State offensive lineman. Regarded as a three-star recruit by Rivals.com, Grasu was ranked as the No. 12 center prospect in his class.

College career
As a freshman, Grasu took over as the starting center for the Oregon Ducks and remained the starter through his senior season. He earned All-Freshman Second-team in 2011, as well as All-Pac-12 First-team in 2012, 2013 and 2014. He was named an All-American in 2013 and 2014. He was also a finalist for the Rimington Trophy in 2013 and 2014.

Professional career

Chicago Bears
Grasu was drafted in the third round by the Chicago Bears with the 71st overall pick of the 2015 NFL Draft. The move reunited him with college teammate Kyle Long.

On August 30, 2016, Grasu was placed on injured reserve.

On September 2, 2018, Grasu was released by the Bears.

Baltimore Ravens
On September 24, 2018, Grasu was signed by the Baltimore Ravens. He played in three games before being released on November 24, 2018.

Miami Dolphins
On December 12, 2018, Grasu was signed by the Miami Dolphins, but was released nine days later.

Tennessee Titans
On February 7, 2019, Grasu was signed by the Tennessee Titans, reuniting with college teammate Marcus Mariota. He was released on August 31, 2019. He was re-signed on September 10, 2019. He was released again on October 8, 2019. He was signed once again on October 31, 2019. He was released on December 3, 2019.

Baltimore Ravens (second stint)
On December 4, 2019, Grasu was claimed off waivers by the Baltimore Ravens.

San Francisco 49ers
On August 20, 2020, Grasu signed with the San Francisco 49ers. He was released on September 5, 2020 and signed to the practice squad the next day. After being elevated to the active roster for the team's first two games, Grasu was promoted to the active roster on September 26, 2020. He was placed on the team's reserve/COVID-19 list by the team on November 19, 2020, and activated on November 25. He was placed back on the COVID-19 list on December 28, 2020, and activated on January 14, 2021.

Las Vegas Raiders
On October 25, 2021, Grasu was signed to the Las Vegas Raiders practice squad. After the Raiders were eliminated in the 2021 Wild Card round of the playoffs, he signed a reserve/future contract on January 17, 2022.

On August 30, 2022, Grasu was waived by the Raiders and signed to the practice squad the next day. He was promoted to the active roster on December 10.

Personal life
Grasu is of Romanian descent. His parents, Ștefan and Mariana Grasu, emigrated from Romania to Los Angeles in 1982, opening the "Greco's New York Pizzeria" on Hollywood Boulevard. His older brother, Nico, was a placekicker for Washington State (2008–10). Grasu means The Fat Man in Romanian language.

Grasu was roommates with Bryan Bennett, Oregon's former backup quarterback and a former teammate of Grasu at Crespi.

His selection with the 71st overall pick in the draft by the Bears was portrayed in the season 7 premiere of The League on FX.

Grasu is engaged to New York Liberty guard Sabrina Ionescu, who is also of Romanian descent.

References

External links
Chicago Bears bio
Oregon Ducks bio
Tennessee Titans bio

1991 births
Living people
American football centers
American people of Romanian descent
Baltimore Ravens players
Chicago Bears players
Las Vegas Raiders players
Miami Dolphins players
Oregon Ducks football players
People from Northridge, Los Angeles
Players of American football from Los Angeles
San Francisco 49ers players
Tennessee Titans players
Romanian players of American football